Haunted Castle may refer to:
The Haunted Castle (1896 film), 1896 French film directed by Georges Méliès
The Haunted Castle (1897 British film), 1897 British film
The Haunted Castle (1897 French film), 1897 French film
The Haunted Castle (1921 film), 1921 German film
The Haunted Castle (1960 film) (Das Spukschloß im Spessart), 1960 West German film
The Haunted Castle (1969 film) (Hiroku kaibyô-den), 1969 Japanese film
Haunted Castle (2001 film), 2001 IMAX movie
Haunted Castle (video game), 1988 arcade game and part of the Castlevania series
The Haunted Castle (book), published in 1979
Haunted Castle (Six Flags Great Adventure), amusement park attraction where eight teenagers died in a fire on May 11, 1984
Haunted Castle (Efteling), 1978 attraction in the amusement park Efteling in the Netherlands